Barbour County School District  is a school district in Barbour County, Alabama.

Statewide testing ranks the schools in Alabama. Those in the bottom six percent are listed as "failing." As of early 2018, Barbour County High School was included in this category.

References

External links
 

School districts in Alabama